Shakti Malviya (born 27 October 1990) is an Indian cricketer. He made his first-class debut for Services in the 2012–13 Ranji Trophy on 24 November 2012. He made his List A debut for Services in the 2016–17 Vijay Hazare Trophy on 25 February 2017.

References

External links
 

1990 births
Living people
Indian cricketers
Services cricketers
Cricketers from Varanasi